Love Island may refer to:

Film
 Love Island (1952 film), an American film directed by Adam Lloyd starring Todd Wathen and Eva Gabor
 Love Island (2014 film), directed by Jasmila Žbanić

Music
 Love Island (album), a 1978 album by Eumir Deodato
 "Love Island" (song), a 1998 song by Fatboy Slim from You've Come a Long Way, Baby

Television
 Love Island (franchise), a television reality franchise
 Love Island (2005 TV series), a British reality television programme where twelve single celebrities spent five weeks on an island in Fiji
 Love Island (2015 TV series), a British revival of the above series set in Majorca
 Love Island Australia, a 2018 Australian reality television programme based on the British version
 Love Island Sweden, a 2018 Swedish reality television program based on the British version
 Love Island (American TV series), a 2019 American reality television program based on the British version
 Love Island (German TV series), a German reality TV format that started in 2017 and is set on Mallorca and (since 2021) Teneriffe